Mr. Bliss is a children's picture book by J. R. R. Tolkien, published posthumously in book form in 1982. One of Tolkien's least-known short works, it tells the story of Mr. Bliss and his first ride in his new motor-car.  Many adventures follow: encounters with bears, angry neighbours, irate shopkeepers, and assorted collisions.

The story was inspired by Tolkien's own vehicular mishaps with his first car, purchased in 1932.  The bears were based on toy bears owned by Tolkien's sons.  Tolkien was both author and illustrator of the book.  His narrative binds the story and illustrations tightly together, as the text often comments directly on the pictures.

Several commentators have compared Mr. Bliss with the works of Beatrix Potter and Edward Lear, and also to The Wind in the Willows.

Mr. Bliss wasn't published during Tolkien's lifetime. He submitted it to his publishers as a balm to readers who were hungry for more from Tolkien after the success of The Hobbit.  The ink and coloured pencil illustrations would have made production costs prohibitively expensive.  Tolkien agreed to redraw the pictures in a simpler style, but then found he didn't have time to do it. The manuscript lay in a drawer until 1957, when he sold it (as well as the original manuscripts of The Lord of the Rings, The Hobbit, and Farmer Giles of Ham) to Marquette University for £1,250.

The book was published in 1982, with Tolkien's difficult-to-read handwritten story and illustrations on one page, and a typeset transcription on the facing page.

Tolkien used two names from Mr. Bliss for hobbits in The Lord of the Rings: Gaffer Gamgee and Boffin.

External links 
 Mr. Bliss, a tale written and illustrated by Tolkien: 25th anniversary of publication

1982 books
Books by J. R. R. Tolkien
Books published posthumously
Allen & Unwin books